The GA-cis RNA motif is a conserved RNA structure that was discovered by bioinformatics.
GA-cis motif RNAs are found in one species classified within the phylum Bacillota: specifically, there are 9 predicted copies in Coprocuccus eutactus ATCC 27759.

GA-cis RNAs are generally located in the 5' untranslated regions of protein-coding genes.  
Indeed, the RNAs are upstream of multiple genes that encode non-homologous proteins.  If all examples of the RNA were upstream of homologous genes, there is the possibility that the RNAs were conserved in that position simply by inheritance.  The non-homology of the genes downstream of COG2908 RNAs makes this scenario less likely.
This evidence suggests that GA-cis RNAs function as cis-regulatory elements.  
However, due to some cases where a GA-cis RNA is not immediately upstream of a gene makes this hypothesis tentative.

The GA-cis RNA motif is named because of the frequent occurrence of conserved GpA di-nucleotides in its sequence, and its locations that are typical of cis-regulatory elements.

References

Non-coding RNA